was a Japanese physician and politician. He served as Governor for the Okayama Prefecture from May 3, 1951 until he died September 21, 1964. During his period as governor, the prefecture went through considerable modernisation, becoming an important industrial district.

Yukiharu Miki was awarded the 1964 Ramon Magsaysay Award for Government Service.

References 

1903 births
1964 deaths
People from Okayama Prefecture
20th-century Japanese physicians
Ramon Magsaysay Award winners
Kyushu University alumni
Governors of Okayama Prefecture